Qarabağlar (also, Garabaghlar) is a village and municipality in the Samukh District of Azerbaijan. It has a population of 1,495.

References 

Populated places in Samukh District